WOWK Television Tower is a 338.94 metre (1,112 ft) tall guyed TV mast at Milton, West Virginia, United States. WOWK Television Tower was built in 1975 and is currently the third-tallest structure in West Virginia. The tallest is the WVAH Tower in Scott Depot, followed by the WSAZ tower.  The structure is the broadcast tower for WOWK-TV.

External links
 
 

Towers in West Virginia
Buildings and structures in Huntington, West Virginia
Towers completed in 1975
1975 establishments in West Virginia